Jardine is an unincorporated village in Park County, Montana, United States. The town lies just to the north of Gardiner on inactive travertine terraces, much like those at Mammoth Hot Springs in nearby Yellowstone National Park. The town's chief industry was a gold mine. The community has the name of A. C. Jardine, a businessperson in the mining industry.

Prospector Joe Brown discovered placer gold near the town site in 1892. Jardine Mining Co. consolidated mining activity in 1917, and by 1943, had produced 4,403 kg of gold, 347,000 kg of tungsten, and 5,722,000 kg of arsenic.

Demographics

References

Unincorporated communities in Park County, Montana
Unincorporated communities in Montana